Emil Roland Hugo Järudd (born 27 April 1998) is a Swedish sailor. He qualified to represent Sweden in the 2020 Tokyo Summer Olympics alongside Cecilia Jonsson, competing at the Mixed Multihull - Nacra 17 Foiling event, where he ranked 14th.

References

External links 
 
 
 
 

1998 births
Living people
Swedish male sailors (sport)
Olympic sailors of Sweden
Sailors at the 2020 Summer Olympics – Nacra 17